LWHS may refer to:
 Lake Washington High School, Kirkland, Washington, United States
 Lake Weir High School, Ocala, Florida, United States
 Lapeer West High School, Lapeer, Michigan, United States
 Lee Williams High School, Kingman, Arizona, United States
 Lick-Wilmerding High School, San Francisco, California, United States
 Little Wound High School, Kyle, South Dakota, United States